Labro may refer to:

People
 Maurice Labro (1910–1987), French film director
 Philippe Labro (born 1936), French author, journalist and film director

Places
 Labro, Etruscan name of Livorno
 Labro, Lazio, Italy
 Labro Meadows Nature Reserve, Sweden